This Is Where We Live is the debut album by American band Paco. It was released on May 18, 2004 by Andy Chase's Unfiltered Records.

Track listing 
Track listing gathered from AllMusic and the album's official liner notes.

References 

2004 debut albums